Findlay McGillivray (born 19 March 1940) is a Scottish former professional footballer who played as a full back.

Career
Born in Newtongrange, Mcgillivray (sometimes known as 'Junior') played for Newtongrange Star, Third Lanark, Rangers, Bradford Park Avenue, St Johnstone and Albion Rovers.

In September 2012, McGillivray was made a Life Members of the Third Lanark Supporters Club.

References

1940 births
Living people
Scottish footballers
Newtongrange Star F.C. players
Third Lanark A.C. players
Rangers F.C. players
Bradford (Park Avenue) A.F.C. players
St Johnstone F.C. players
Albion Rovers F.C. players
Scottish Junior Football Association players
Scottish Football League players
English Football League players
Scotland under-23 international footballers
Association football fullbacks
Sportspeople from Midlothian